Haritha TV is a Sri Lankan 4K Ultra HD entertainment channel currently broadcasting in Sri Lanka in the Sinhala language. The channel airs content mainly focusing about agriculture and also broadcast programmes based on folk arts, nature, heritage and local culture. It is also regarded as Sri Lanka's first exclusive television channel to have been launched with the intention of promoting sustainable agriculture.

Background 
Haritha TV, an exclusive television channel dedicated to the promotion and development of sustainable agriculture will be launched, lending space for an industry that is the cornerstone of the country's economy

Vision
Improved rural livelihoods and sustainable food systems and agro communities in Sri Lanka by 2030.

Mission
To promote agroecological principles and rural entrepreneurship through capacity development and dissemination of knowledge, create a platform for farming communities to share experiences, while espousing Sustainable Development Goals.

Values
• Respect and value for local knowledge and innovations
• Value the environment and ecosystems
• Creative, flexible and innovative
• Sensitive to culture and tradition, gender, ethnic background and religious beliefs • Quality, equality and ethics
• Passion and humanity

Haritha TV is a timely intervention, when globally, food security, sustainable development and climate change and its impact on agriculture and food availability have become concerns. One key factor in the UN Sustainable Development Goals, under the
custodianship of the Food and Agriculture Organization is to, “End hunger, achieve food security and improved nutrition and promote sustainable agriculture”, which is a call to respect the environment and focus on the dangers of climate change, while supporting sustainable agriculture, empowering small farmers, promoting gender equality, ending rural poverty, and ensuring healthy lifestyles.
Haritha TV is also timely for Sri Lanka. Following on the policy document - ‘vistas of prosperity and splendour’, the agriculture sector has become the main driver of the government's pursuit of self-reliance. The government's mission thrust is to forge a production economy based on intensified agriculture and livestock farming and agro- food sector development, that are eco-friendly and sustainable. The initiative, while achieving its main objective, will in the meantime, uplift the farmers and their communities through multipronged interventions at State and private sector level.

This new necessity has led the country into an agrarian transformation; an exodus towards cultivation. Therefore, integral is the State's commitment to manage the environment and natural resources of the country, maintaining the equilibrium between the trends in rapid economic development and in the use of the natural resources with the support of several key institutions - the Ministry of Agriculture, Rural Economic Affairs, Livestock Development, Irrigation and Fisheries and Aquatic Resource Development and the Ministry of Environment.

Haritha TV was launched by the Sri Jinarathana Educational Institute of the Hunupitiya Gangaramaya Temple on 31 March 2021 under the patronage of Sri Lankan President Gotabaya Rajapaksa.

The channel was created by the Sri Jinarathana Board of Education Regulation Sabha which is affiliated with the Gangaramaya Temple.

References 

Sinhala-language television stations
Television channels and stations established in 2021
Mass media in Colombo
2021 establishments in Sri Lanka
Agricultural television stations